Collinsella intestinalis  is a Gram-positive and anaerobic bacterium from the genus of Collinsella which has been isolated from human feces in Japan Collinsella intestinalis occur in the human intestine.

References

Further reading 
 

Coriobacteriaceae
Bacteria described in 2000